Newcastle West is an inner city suburb of Newcastle, New South Wales, Australia, part of which forms the western end of Newcastle's central business district. The suburb is primarily a retail/commercial trading district but includes one high school.

At the  Newcastle West had a population of 618.

Education
Newcastle High School, located at the intersection of National Park Street and Parkway Avenue, is a state run high school that has an enrolment of approximately 1,000 students.

Heritage listings
Newcastle West has a number of heritage-listed sites, including:
 787 Hunter Street: Castlemaine Brewery
 434 King Street: Miss Porter's House

Notes

  Area obtained from New South Wales Department of Lands imagery and 1:100000 map Newcastle 9232.

References

Suburbs of Newcastle, New South Wales